David Millar (born 1977) is a British cyclist.

David Millar may also refer to:

 David Millar (politician) (born 1955), former Canadian politician
 David Millar (RCAF officer), Royal Canadian Air Force officer
 David Millar (civil servant), Scottish civil servant
 David Millar (sailor) in 1964 Star World Championships

See also
David Miller (disambiguation)